Matthew Kailey Fosh (born 26 September 1957) is an English former first-class cricketer who played 30 games for Cambridge University, Combined Universities and Essex between 1976 and 1978. A left-handed batsman tipped for high honours in his youth, Fosh decided against taking up a career in the county game. Following his career in cricket, Fosh became a financier in the City.

Early life and education
Fosh is the son of Arthur Fosh, of Egg Hall, Epping, Essex, an Old Harrovian who also studied at Pembroke College, Cambridge and was owner of lithographic printing company Fosh & Cross, on Mansell Street, on the edge of the City of London. Fosh was educated at Harrow School, where he played in a band called Toyd, two members of which later found success in the 1980s as Red Box. Fosh is a trustee of the Harrow Development Trust, dedicated to improving the school including through financial donations.

He then went up to Magdalene College, Cambridge, where he took a BA in 1979.

Cricket and rugby
Fosh played cricket at school, including as captain; in 2017, he still held "the highest score since the First World War... 161 not out" in the Eton v Harrow match, which was first played in 1805. His son, Max, also played cricket for Harrow.

He got a double blue (representing participation in sport at the highest level) at Cambridge for cricket and rugby union. Fosh scored 1069 runs at 23.33 with one century, 109 for Cambridge against Derbyshire, and six fifties. In 14 list A one-day matches he scored 307 runs at 21.92 with a best of 45. He toured the West Indies with the England Young Cricketers in 1976 and played in one 'test match' in Trinidad alongside Mike Gatting and David Gower, scoring 41 in the first innings of a game won by England by 22 runs.

He represented Cambridge at rugby union in the 1978 and 1979 Varsity Matches.

Business career
After Cambridge, Fosh travelled for 18 months, then went to work in London in financial public relations and private client fund management for stockbrokers Strauss Turnbull and Carr Sheppards. He founded futures and options broker SGF with a school friend, selling it in 2000 for a seven-figure sum; he left in 2002 and went to work at Lloyd's insurer SVB Holdings, where he became chief executive. He is currently chief executive officer at Novae Group.

Personal life
Fosh was married to Dutch advertising and financial public relations executive Helena, daughter of diplomat Joost van der Kun and his wife Adrienne, daughter of Jonkheer Thomas Theodore Flugi van Aspermont, vice-consul at Marseilles. The couple have two children: daughter Talitha (Tally), and son Maximilian (Max), a YouTuber and independent candidate in the 2021 London mayoral election. Helena Fosh subsequently married Sir John Auld Mactaggart, 4th Baronet.

References

External links 
Cricinfo Profile
Cricket Archive Statistics

Living people
1957 births
Essex cricketers
Cambridge University cricketers
Cambridge University R.U.F.C. players
British Universities cricketers
English cricketers
People educated at Harrow School